Ernest Frank Champion was a footballer who played as a right back for Charlton Athletic in the Football League. He also played for Catford Southend.

References

English footballers
Charlton Athletic F.C. players
English Football League players
Year of birth missing
Year of death missing
Place of birth missing
Association football fullbacks